{{Infobox person
| name               = Kasia Madera
| image              = 
| caption            = 
| alt                = 
| birth_name         = Katarzyna Madera
| birth_date         = 
| birth_place        = London, England
| education          = Queen Mary University of London
| employer           = BBC
| occupation         = Journalist, television presenter
| parents            = 
| spouse             = 
| children           = 2 sons
| credits            = BBC OneBBC TwoBBC ThreeBBC FourBBC NewsBBC World NewsNewsdayWorld News Today with Kasia MaderaGMTImpactGlobalOutside SourceThe Papers| agent              = 
| URL                = 
}}

Katarzyna "Kasia" Madera (born 4 October 1975) is a British journalist and television news presenter. She fronts mainly evening and overnight bulletins on BBC One, the BBC News Channel and BBC World News, presenting the Newsday strand on Friday from London with Sharanjit Leyl in Singapore and World News Today on Friday.

In 2013 she became one of the main presenters of World News Today broadcast on BBC Four, BBC World News and the BBC News Channel, and then its deputy presenter following the departure of Zeinab Badawi. She is a relief presenter on the BBC News Channel, and the BBC News at One.

Early life and education
Madera was born in London on 4 October 1975 to Polish parents, her mother came from the town of Garwolin, in eastern Poland, and her father came from Lviv (then part of Poland, now located in western Ukraine). She graduated from Queen Mary & Westfield, University of London, with a 2:1 in French and politics.

Career
After joining the BBC graduate programme in 2002, she initially presented BBC Three's youth-oriented news bulletin 60 Seconds.  She then presented the round-up of the day's entertainment and celebrity news in E24.Formally joining the BBC News Channel as a news presenter, she presents as a regular stand-in, alongside her roles on Newsday and World News Today''. She works for BBC News and BBC World News as the news anchor of the evening and overnight bulletins.. Madera presented the most-watched BBC One, the BBC News Channel and BBC World News simulcast following the opening ceremony of London 2012 Olympics when the Channel achieved its highest ever viewing figures. Also the overnight coverage of The Death of Nelson Mandela.

Madera speaks Polish, and as a result reported for the BBC News Channel on the 2007 Polish parliamentary election and again in 2015, 2014 European Elections, and the 2010 Polish Air Force Tu-154 crash in Russia, which killed 96 people including Polish President Lech Kaczyński. She also took over from Huw Edwards after the death of Nelson Mandela presenting overnight coverage on BBC One, BBC World News, the BBC News Channel and PBS.

On February 2 2023, it was confirmed that Kasia – alongside many other presenters of the domestic BBC News Channel – would lose their presenting roles as part of the BBC's relaunched news channel.

Personal life
Madera is married, with two sons.

See also

 List of BBC newsreaders and reporters
 List of people from London
 List of University of London people

References

External links
 

Living people
English people of Polish descent
English people of Ukrainian descent
Alumni of Queen Mary University of London
Alumni of City, University of London
English television journalists
English women journalists
BBC newsreaders and journalists
BBC World News
British radio presenters
British women television journalists
British women radio presenters
1974 births